The theology of the Seventh-day Adventist Church resembles that of Protestant Christianity, combining elements from Lutheran, Wesleyan-Arminian, and Anabaptist branches of Protestantism. Adventists believe in the infallibility of Scripture and teach that salvation comes from grace through faith in Jesus Christ. The 28 fundamental beliefs constitute the church's official doctrinal position.

There are many teachings held exclusively by Seventh-day Adventists. Some distinctive doctrines of the Seventh-Day Adventist church which differentiate it from other Christian churches include: the perpetuity of the seventh-day Sabbath, the unconsciousness of man in death, conditional immortality, an atoning ministry of Jesus Christ in the heavenly sanctuary, and an “investigative judgment” that commenced in 1844. Furthermore, a traditionally historicist approach to prophecy has led Adventists to develop a unique system of eschatological beliefs which incorporates a commandment-keeping "remnant", a universal end-time crisis revolving around the law of God, and the visible return of Jesus Christ prior to a millennial reign of believers in heaven.

(For differing theological perspectives, see the articles on Progressive Adventists and Historic Adventists.)

Overview

Official beliefs

The Seventh-day Adventist denomination expresses its official teachings in a formal statement known as the 28 Fundamental Beliefs. This statement of beliefs was originally adopted by the church's General Conference in 1980, with an additional belief (number 11) being added in 2005.  The General Conference session in San Antonio 2015 made some changes to the wording of several fundamental beliefs. Also significant are the baptismal vows, of which there are two versions; candidates for church membership are required to accept one.

In addition to the fundamental beliefs, a number of "Official Statements" have been voted on by the church leadership, although only some of these are doctrinal in nature. The Seventh-day Adventist Bible Commentary is a significant expression of Adventist theological thought.

Source of authority

View of Scripture
The first fundamental belief of the church stated that "The Holy Scriptures are the infallible revelation of [God's] will." Adventist theologians generally reject the "verbal inspiration" position on Scripture held by many conservative evangelical Christians. They believe instead that God inspired the thoughts of the biblical authors, and that the authors then expressed these thoughts in their own words. This view is popularly known as "thought inspiration", and most Adventist members hold to that view. According to Ed Christian, former JATS editor, "few if any ATS members believe in verbal inerrancy".

Adventists generally reject higher critical approaches to Scripture. The 1986 statement Methods of Bible Study, "urge[s] Adventist Bible students to avoid relying on the use of the presuppositions and the resultant deductions associated with the historical-critical method."

Role of Ellen White

Seventh-day Adventist approaches to theology are affected by the level of authority accorded the writings of Ellen White. Mainstream Adventists believe that White had the spiritual gift of prophecy, but that her writings are subject to testing by the Bible, which has ultimate authority.

According to one church document, "her expositions on any given Bible passage offer an inspired guide to the meaning of texts without exhausting their meaning or preempting the task of exegesis". "The Inspiration and Authority of the Ellen G. White Writings",  document was issued by the Biblical Research Institute of the General Conference of Seventh-day Adventists. It has received worldwide review and input, although is not an official statement. It concludes that a proper understanding will avoid the two extremes of regarding her "writings as functioning on a canonical level identical with Scripture, or […] considering them as ordinary Christian literature."

Relation to other groups

Adventist theology is distinctly Protestant, and holds much in common with Evangelicalism in particular. However, in common with many restorationist groups, Adventists have traditionally taught that the majority of Protestant churches have failed to "complete" the Reformation by overturning the errors of Roman Catholicism (see also Great Apostasy) and "restoring" the beliefs and practices of the primitive church—including Sabbath keeping, adult baptism and conditional immortality.

Adventists typically do not consider themselves part of the Fundamentalist Christianity community: "Theologically, Seventh-day Adventists have a number of beliefs in common with Fundamentalists, but for various reasons have never been identified with the movement... On their part, Adventists reject as unbiblical a number of teachings held by many (though not all) Fundamentalists..."

Historical development

Seventh-day Adventist theology has undergone development from the beginnings of the movement. Doctrinal development has been associated with significant events, including the 1888 Minneapolis General Conference and discussions with evangelicals in the middle of the 20th century which prompted the publication of Seventh-day Adventists Answer Questions on Doctrine. As a consequence of these developments, different theological streams have emerged which today exist alongside the mainstream of the Church.

While Adventism is a child of the 16th century Reformation initiated by Martin Luther, John Calvin and Ulrich Zwingli, its theological orientation really finds itself at home with the Radical Reformation or the Anabaptists.  Anabaptists went back to the original early church teachings and rejected infant baptism and state support of the church. They called for a believer's church where baptism followed faith, and stood for a separation of church and state. Anabaptists viewed the Major Reformation churches as not being consistent in the belief of Sola Scriptura. They sought to get back towards New Testament church ideals, rather than stick to where Luther, Calvin or Zwingli did theologically, moving away from church traditions and creedal formulas.

"Present Truth" and the Pillars

The early Adventists emphasized the concept of "present truth"—see  (NKJV).  James White explained, “The church [has] ever had a present truth.  The present truth now, is that which shows present duty, and the right position for us…” ”Present truth is present truth, and not future truth, and the Word as a lamp shines brightly where we stand, and not so plainly on the path in the distance.”  Ellen White pointed out that “present truth, which is a test to the people of this generation, was not a test to the people of generations far back.”  The founders of the SDA church had a dynamic concept of what they called present truth, opposed to creedal rigidity, and had an openness to new theological understandings that built upon the landmark doctrines, or Pillars of Adventism that had made them a people.

These foundations, pillars, and landmarks are:
 the investigative judgment,
 the sanctuary that brings this judgment to light,
 the three angels' messages of Revelation,
 the law of God,
 the faith of Jesus,
 the Sabbath,
 the state of the dead, and
 the special gift of prophecy.

Still, the possibilities of dynamic change in Seventh-day Adventist beliefs are not unlimited.  Those landmark doctrines are non-negotiables in Adventist theology. Collectively they have provided the Seventh-day Adventists with an identity.  The pillars of their faith—the Bible doctrines that define who they are as a people—have been thoroughly studied out in the Scripture and have been attested to by the convicting power of the Holy Spirit.  As Ellen White put it,  "When the power of God testifies as to what is truth, that truth is to stand forever as the truth. ... Men will arise with interpretations of Scripture which are to them truth, but which are not truth.  The truth for this time, God has given us as a foundation for our faith.  Robert Johnston noted, “Without repudiating the past leading of the Lord, it [the Seventh-day Adventist church] seeks even to understand better what that leading was.   It is always open to better insights to learn—to seek for truth as for hid treasure. …  Adventists are still pilgrims on a doctrinal journey who do not repudiate the way marks, but neither do they remain stopped at any of them.” Ellen further said that there is more truth to be revealed and that true doctrine will stand close investigation.  But there is a solid foundation to build new truth upon.

Unity and variation

A 2002 survey of Adventists worldwide showed 91% acceptance of the following beliefs:

A "Valuegenesis" study in 2000 of students at Adventist high schools in North America showed a generally high acceptance of the church's beliefs, with some such as marriage within the same faith, the remnant, Ellen White's gift of prophecy, and the investigative judgment with acceptance rates less than 63% percent. "In looking at the research this may be because over the first ten years of Valuegenesis research, fewer young people were reading their Bibles and Ellen White. And for a church that values a written revelation of God, less reading of the Bible probably means less understanding of its beliefs."

In a 1985 questionnaire, the percentage of North American Adventist lecturers who nominated various beliefs as contributions they believed Adventists had made to contemporary theology are:

Theological spectrum
A theological spectrum exists within Adventism, with several different theological streams existing alongside the mainstream. The conservative "historic" movement holds to certain traditional positions that have been challenged since the 1950s. By contrast, progressive Adventists typically question some of the church's distinctive teachings, and some of the fundamental beliefs of the church that are held by mainstream Adventists.

In a 1985 survey of North American Adventist lecturers, 45% described themselves as liberal compared to other church members, 40% as mainstream, 11% as conservative, and 4% gave no response to the question. There are two main organizations of Adventist scholars or interested laypeople. The Adventist Theological Society describes its beliefs as "balanced and conservative Adventist theology", whereas the Adventist Society for Religious Studies is more progressive by comparison.

Jon Paulien has identified four brands of Adventism – evangelists and frontier missionaries whose beliefs are traditional yet creatively expressed, scholars concerned with an accurate understanding of the Bible, the typical church member (including most of the younger, postmodern generation) who is most concerned with what is relevant to ordinary life and not concerned with most doctrines, and those in the Third World who are similarly concerned for a minimal belief set and passionate about their faith.

Regional and cultural differences 
There is a common perception that different cultures and regions of the world vary in their theology.

According to Edwin Hernández, the principal investigator of the AVANCE study into Latino Adventists in the North American Division, "There was a very high degree (95 percent) of fidelity to the orthodox teachings of the church."

Shared Protestant doctrine
Seventh-day Adventists uphold the central doctrines of Protestant Christianity: the Trinity, the incarnation, the virgin birth, the substitutionary atonement, justification by faith, creation,  the second coming, the resurrection of the dead, and last judgment.

In Seventh-day Adventists Answer Questions on Doctrine (1957), four authors outlined the core doctrines that they share with Protestant Christianity.

"In Common With Conservative Christians and the Historic Protestant Creeds, We Believe—

1. That God is the Sovereign Creator, upholder, and ruler of the universe, and that He is eternal, omnipotent, omniscient, and omnipresent.
2. That the Godhead, the Trinity, comprises God the Father, Christ the Son, and the Holy Spirit.
3. That the Scriptures are the inspired revelation of God to men; and that the Bible is the sole rule of faith and practice.
4. That Jesus Christ is very God, and that He has existed with the Father from all eternity.
5. That the Holy Spirit is a personal being, sharing the attributes of deity with the Father and the Son.
6. That Christ, the Word of God, became incarnate through the miraculous conception and the virgin birth; and that He lived an absolutely sinless life here on earth.
7. That the vicarious, atoning death of Jesus Christ, once for all, is all-sufficient for the redemption of a lost race.
8. That Jesus Christ arose literally and bodily from the grave.
9. That He ascended literally and bodily into heaven.
10. That He now serves as our advocate in priestly ministry and mediation before the Father.
11. That He will return in a premillennial, personal, imminent second advent.
12. That man was created sinless, but by his subsequent fall entered a state of alienation and depravity.
13. That salvation through Christ is by grace alone, through faith in His blood.
14. That entrance upon the new life in Christ is by regeneration, or the new birth.
15. That man is justified by faith.
16. That man is sanctified by the indwelling Christ through the Holy Spirit.
17. That man will be glorified at the resurrection or translation of the saints, when the Lord returns.
18. That there will be a judgment of all men.
19. That the gospel is to be preached as a witness to all the world."

All of these doctrines, with the exception of item 11 (regarding the premillennial return of Christ), are widely held amongst conservative or evangelical Protestants. (Different Protestant groups hold varying views on the millennium.)

Regarding salvation, a major statement was the 1980 "The Dynamics of Salvation ".

Distinctive doctrines
Seventh-day Adventists have often focused on those doctrines which are distinctive to Adventism. This was particularly true in the early days of the movement, when it was assumed that most people the church witnessed to were already Christian to begin with, and that they already understood the gospel.

Sabbath and the Biblical Law

Biblical Law and the Ten Commandments

Seventh-day Adventists believe that "the great principles of God's law are embodied in the Ten Commandments", and that these are "binding upon all people in every age" (Fundamental Belief no. 19). While the ceremonial and sacrificial laws of the Old Testament were fulfilled by the death of Jesus Christ, the 10 commandments are held to remain in force for Christian believers.
"Do not think that I have come to abolish the Law or the Prophets; I have not come to abolish them but to fulfill them. I tell you the truth, until heaven and earth disappear, not the smallest letter, not the least stroke of a pen, will by any means disappear from the Law until everything is accomplished. Anyone who breaks one of the least of these commandments and teaches others to do the same will be called least in the kingdom of heaven, but whoever practices and teaches these commands will be called great in the kingdom of heaven. For I tell you that unless your righteousness surpasses that of the Pharisees and the teachers of the law, you will certainly not enter the kingdom of heaven."

The Seventh-Day Sabbath

Seventh-day Adventists believe that the seventh day of the week, Saturday, is the biblical Sabbath which God set "apart for the lofty purpose of enriching the divine-human relationship". The Sabbath is a recurring message in the Bible, mentioned in the Creation account, at Sinai, in the ministry of Jesus Christ and in the ministries of the apostles. The Sabbath serves as a weekly memorial to Creation and is a symbol of redemption, from both Egypt and sin. By keeping the Sabbath, Adventists are reminded of the way that God can make them holy, like he did the Sabbath, and they show their loyalty to God by keeping the commandment in the Decalogue. The Sabbath is also a time for Adventists to spend with other people and with God.

Adventists believe that the Sabbath is not just a holiday but rather is intended as a rest for believers to grow spiritually. Although Seventh-day Adventists do not believe that they are saved by keeping Saturday as the Sabbath, they attach considerably greater significance to Saturday-Sabbath keeping than other denominations attach to worship on Sunday.

Adventists do not see salvation as a works-based doctrine, but rather righteousness comes solely through faith in Christ alone. The Sabbath commandment is seen as an act of faith in God's ideal for the believer, although its significance may not be seen by non-believers.

They believe that the Sabbath is a whole day dedicated for worship and fellowship with believers, laying aside non-religious projects and labor.

Seventh-day Adventists teach that there is no evidence of the Sabbath being changed to Sunday in the Bible. They teach instead that it was changed by gradual acceptance of Sunday worship gatherings which came into the early church in Rome to distinguish Christians from the Jews and to align Christianity with political authorities. This change became more universally accepted with the establishment of Roman emperor Constantine's Sunday law of 321 AD and the decree at the Council of Laodicea that in canon 29 declared that Christians should avoid work on Sunday.

The Great Controversy
Seventh-day Adventists believe that prior to the beginning of human history, a challenge occurred in heaven between God and Lucifer (Satan) over "the character of God, His law, and His sovereignty over the universe" (Fundamental Belief no. 8). Lucifer was subsequently cast out of heaven, and, acting through the serpent in the Garden of Eden, led Adam and Eve into sin. God has permitted Lucifer's rebellion to continue on Earth in order to demonstrate to angels and beings on other worlds that his Law is righteous and necessary, and that the breaking of the 10 commandments leads to moral catastrophe.

This understanding of the origin of evil is derived from the Bible (see Rev. 12:4-9; Isa. 14:12-14; Eze. 28:12-18; Gen. 3; Rom. 1:19-32; 5:12-21; 8:19-22; Gen. 6-8; 2 Peter 3:6; 1 Cor. 4:9; Heb. 1:14.).  The book entitled The Great Controversy by Ellen G. White, particularly chapter 29, The Origin of Evil shows how this dispute originated.

Heavenly Sanctuary and Pre-Advent Judgment

The Heavenly Sanctuary
The Seventh-day Adventist church teaches that there is a sanctuary in heaven which was foreshadowed by the Mosaic tabernacle, according to their interpretation of the Epistle to the Hebrews chapters 8 and 9. After his death, resurrection and ascension, Jesus Christ entered the heavenly sanctuary as the great High Priest, "making available to believers the benefits of His atoning sacrifice" (Fundamental Belief no. 24). Adventists hold that Christ ministered his blood in the first section of the sanctuary (the holy place) until October 1844; after that time he entered the second section of the sanctuary (the Most Holy Place, or Holy of Holies) in fulfillment of the Day of Atonement.

Adventists therefore believe that Christ's work of atonement encompasses both his death on the Cross and his ministration in the heavenly sanctuary

Venden points out that the atonement must have been complete at the cross—the sacrifice was sufficient.  For when Jesus died for man's sin, it was enough to purchase man's salvation and man cannot add anything to it.  Yet, the atonement involves more than just sacrifice.  The process of redemption, the restoration of man's broken relationship to at-one-ment with God, was not completed at the cross, else there would be no more sin or suffering.  It is the winning of men back to a love relationship with God that is not yet completed.

Early Adventists emphasized the two parts to the atonement:

They refer to his mediatorial work in heaven as an "atoning ministry" (as in Fundamental Belief no. 24).

Investigative Judgment

The investigative judgment is a doctrine unique to Seventh-day Adventism, and teaches that the judgment of God's professed people began on October 22, 1844 when Christ entered the Holy of Holies in the heavenly sanctuary. The purpose of this judgment is to vindicate the saints before the onlooking universe, to prepare them for Christ's imminent Second Coming, and to demonstrate God's righteous character in His dealings with humanity. This judgment will also separate true believers from those who falsely claim to be ones.

The biblical basis of the investigative judgment teaching was challenged in 1980 by ex-Adventist professor Desmond Ford. (See Glacier View controversy.) While the church has officially reaffirmed its basic position on the doctrine since 1980, many of those within the church's progressive wing continue to be critical of the teaching. According to a 2002 worldwide survey, local church leaders estimated 86% of church members accept the doctrine.

Eschatology

The Remnant Church

The Seventh-day Adventist church regards itself as the "remnant" of Revelation 12:17 (KJV). The Remnant church "announces the arrival of the judgment hour, proclaims salvation through Christ, and heralds the approach of His second advent" (Fundamental Belief no. 13). The duty of the Remnant is summed up in the "Three Angels' Messages" of Revelation 14:6-12, and its two distinguishing marks are seventh-day Sabbath observance and the Spirit of Prophecy (see below).

At baptism, Adventists may be asked the following question: "Do you accept and believe that the Seventh-day Adventist Church is the remnant church of Bible prophecy and that people of every nation, race, and language are invited and accepted into its fellowship?" (NB. In 2005 an alternative set of baptismal vows was created, which does not contain a reference to the Adventist church as the remnant. Candidates may now choose whether to take the original vow or the new one.)

Second coming of Christ

Seventh-day Adventists believe in an imminent, universally visible Second Coming of Christ, which will be preceded by a "time of trouble". Adventists believe that the unrighteous, or wicked, will be raised after the millennium.

As compared to other Christian views of eschatology, the Seventh-day Adventist view is closest to Historic (or post-tribulational) Premillennialism. Conditions on earth are expected to steadily deteriorate until the "time of trouble"The Great Controversy (which is similar to the Great Tribulation of classic premillennialist teaching), when civil and religious authorities will combine to unleash intense persecution upon God's people, particularly those who keep the seventh-day Sabbath. The time of trouble will be ended by the glorious appearing of Christ, which will also mark the commencement of the millennium.

Adventists reject dispensationalist theology and the pretribulation rapture, believing that the church will remain on earth throughout the end-time crisis. A further difference is that the millennial reign of Christ will take place in heaven, not on earth, and will involve all of the redeemed people of God, not just national Israel (See Fundamental Beliefs, no. 26 & 27.)

Seventh-day Adventism interprets the book of Revelation using the historicist method, but also holds that some of the events it predicts are still future (see: interpretations of the Book of Revelation).

Hell and the state of the dead

Seventh-day Adventists believe that death is a state of unconscious sleep until the resurrection. These verses, it is argued, indicate that death is only a period or form of slumber.

They reject the traditional doctrine of hell as a state of everlasting conscious torment, believing instead that the wicked will be permanently destroyed after the millennium. The theological term for this teaching is Annihilationism.

The Adventist views about death and hell reflect an underlying belief in: (a) conditional immortality (or conditionalism), as opposed to the immortality of the soul; and (b) the holistic (or monistic) Christian anthropology or nature of human beings, as opposed to bipartite or tripartite views. Adventist education hence strives to be holistic in nature, involving not just the mind but all aspects of a person.

This belief in conditional immortality has been one of the doctrines used by critics (particularly in the past) to claim that the church is not a mainstream Christian denomination. However, this view is becoming more mainstream within evangelicalism, as evidenced by the British Evangelical Alliance ACUTE report, which states the doctrine is a "significant minority evangelical view" which has "grown within evangelicalism in recent years". Evangelical theologian and conditionalist Clark Pinnock suggests Adventist Le Roy Edwin Froom's The Conditionalist Faith of our Fathers, 2 vols., is "a classic defense on conditionalism".

Spirit of Prophecy

The church believes the spiritual gift of prophecy was manifested in the ministry of Ellen White, whose writings are sometimes referred to as the "Spirit of Prophecy". The church's 28 Fundamental Beliefs state:
"her writings are a continuing and authoritative source of truth which provide for the church comfort, guidance, instruction, and correction. They also make clear that the Bible is the standard by which all teaching and experience must be tested."

Two other official statements regarding the prophetic ministry of Ellen White have recently been voted at General Conference Sessions. The June 1995 document A Statement of Confidence in the Spirit of Prophecy states that White "did the work of a prophet, and more", and that her writings "carry divine authority, both for godly living and for doctrine"; and recommended that "as a church we seek the power of the Holy Spirit to apply to our lives more fully the inspired counsel contained in the writings of Ellen G White." The 2005 document Resolution on the Spirit of Prophecy called upon "Seventh-day Adventists throughout the world to prayerfully study her writings, in order to understand more fully God's purpose for His remnant people", describing her writings as "theological stimulus".

There has been an increasing tendency in the church to view White in more human terms, although still inspired. Whatever the prominence assigned to her writings for doctrinal authority, Adventists are agreed that the Bible takes precedence as the final authority.

Trinitarian development, Christology and Pneumatology

Early Seventh-day Adventists came from a wide assortment of nineteenth-century American Protestant churches, highly influenced in thought and teaching by Anabaptism and Restorationism. The vast majority of early Seventh-day Adventists writers rejected the Trinity  Two of the church's principal founders, James White and Joseph Bates, had a background in the Restorationist Christian Connection church, which rejected the Trinitarian nature of God.

Ellen White, another principal founder, was raised in a Methodist family but she gave testimonies that did not agree with trinitarian creeds of her time. She, along with her husband, faced criticism from a missionary as "not sound upon the subject of his triune God." While Ellen White never condemned the Trinity as an error, like other early Adventists did, her writings appear incompatible with orthodoxy Trinitarianism because her visions taught that God had a form  whereas trinitarian creeds, like the Methodist creed, declared that God to be without body and parts. Ellen White ultimately proved influential in shifting the church from largely Semi-Arian roots towards a view that Seventh-day Adventists today label as Biblical Trinitarianism.

Up to the 1890s most Seventh-day Adventists were anti/non-Trinitarian. They viewed God the Father as God in every way, the Son as divine but begotten at an incalculable point in the very distant past, and the person-hood of the Holy Spirit was a matter debate. The 1872 Declaration of the Fundamental Principles Taught & Practiced by the Seventh-day Adventists declared God to be "everywhere present by his representative, the Holy Spirit. Ps. 139:7" (Article I) and asserting that the "Spirit has simply made provision for its own existence and presence with the people of God to the end of time, to lead to an understanding of that word which it had inspired, to convince of sin, and work a transformation in the heart and life; and that those who deny to the Spirit its place and operation, do plainly deny that part of the Bible which assigns to it this work and position." (Article XVI) 

Numerous factors within Adventism brought the issue to a head starting around 1890.

One factor was the successful proselytizing efforts of Seventh-day Adventists brought in new members who might rightly be called closeted Trinitarians. Woodrow Whidden notes:

“...In an odd sort of way, the somewhat isolated, anti-ecumenical Adventists, thanks to their proselytizing success, became ecumenical in the sense that they were able, through these converts, to tap into the great tradition of the ecumenical creeds of the first four centuries (Woodrow Whidden: Andrews University Berrien Springs, MI (USA) A Paper Presented to The Tenth Oxford Institute of Methodist Theol. Studies Working Group: History of Wesleyan Traditions:  Nineteenth and Twentieth Centuries  August 12–22, 1997 Oxford University Somerville College)

Another factor, one that is often overlooked in Adventism, was the impact of criticism against the Seventh-day Adventist church. While numerous scholars, Gane (1963), Holt (1969), Froom (1971), Burt (1996), Whidden (1998), and Moon (2003) have attempted to account for the factors of how and why the Seventh-day Adventist church changed its view, there is very little Adventist research that shows criticism as a major factor for positive usages of the word "Trinity" in Adventism from the 1890s onward. Gilbert Valentine briefly mentions this factor, by implication, when he wrote of the discussions in the mid 1950s between SDA leaders and Evangelical leaders Walter Martin and Donald Barnhouse. He wrote that "the issue of apologetics again became the main motivating factor in the attempt to find ways to express Adventist understandings more clearly and adequately both for those inside and outside the community.". Recent scholarship attempts to compensate for this overlooked factor 

And yet another important factor was the development of new thoughts in Adventist soteriology as expressed at the  important 1888 Conference. These thoughts were presented in the preaching of A. T. Jones and E. J. Waggoner. These men planted a seed that grew into a new focus on the Biblical doctrine of the Godhead. This was due, in part, to their emphasis on Jesus and how the law and righteousness by faith come together.

During the 1890s Jones played an important role in presenting the eternal deity of Jesus. During his 1895 series on the third angel's message, he returned repeatedly to Colossians 2:9. Christ was the “fullness of the Godhead bodily.” “The eternal Word consented to be made flesh. God became man.”13 Two days later, speaking of Christ, Jones said: “In view of eternity before and eternity after, thirty-three years is not such an infinite sacrifice after all. But when we consider that he sank his nature in our human nature to all eternity—that is a sacrifice.”. A.T. Jones also continued to emphasize the birth of the pre-incarnate Son of God. During that same 1895 series Jones asserted that "He who was born in the form of God took the form of man." This same teaching was reiterated by Jones again in 1889 when he wrote: “He [Jesus] was born of the Holy Ghost. In other words, Jesus Christ was born again. He came from heaven, God’s first-born, to the earth, and was born again. But all in Christ’s work goes by opposites for us: He, the sinless One, was made to be sin in order that we might be made the righteousness of God in Him. He, the living One, the Prince and Author of life, died that we might live. He whose goings forth have been from the days of eternity, the first-born of God, was born again in order that we might be born again.”. This is in harmony with his teaching two years prior when he asserted:

"Unto none of the angels did the Father say that, for none of the angels were begotten of the Father; they were all created by Christ, for we have read that whether they be “thrones, or dominions, or principalities, or powers,” all were made by him, and without him was not anything made that was made; while the Son Himself WAS DIRECTLY BEGOTTEN OF THE FATHER, AND SO IS CALLED HIS ONLY BEGOTTEN SON...” (A. T. Jones, Sign of the Times July 7, 1887.)

How Jones rationalized the eternal existence of the pre-incarnate Son of God and His birth in the form of God prior to His re-birth in the form of man here on earth is best explained in an 1886 article.

“IN the beginning was the Word, and the Word was with God, and the Word was God. The same was in the beginning with God.” “In the beginning,” that is, before creation, BEFORE TIME WAS; for in his prayer at the last supper he said: “O Father, glorify thou me with thine own self with the glory which I had with thee before the world was.” “Father, I will that they also, whom thou hast given me, be with me where I am; that they may behold the glory which thou hast given me; for thou lovedst me before the foundation of the world.” John 17:5, 24. HOW LONG BEFORE, NO FINITE MIND CAN MEASURE; for in the announcement by the prophet of the place of his birth, when he came into the world, it is said: “But thou, Bethlehem Ephratah, though thou be little among the thousands of Judah, yet out of thee shall he come forth unto me that is to be ruler in Israel; whose goings forth have been from of old, from everlasting.” Micah 5:2. The margin reads, Hebrew, from “the days of eternity.” THE MIND MUST BE ABLE TO GRASP ETERNITY BEFORE IT CAN MEASURE THE LENGTH OF DAYS OF THE SAVIOUR OF THE WORLD; BEFORE IT CAN KNOW HOW LONG THE WORD WAS BEFORE THE WORLD WAS. (Signs of the Times March 25, 1886, p. 186.1, caps emphasis added)

A.T. Jones gave particular emphasis to the begotten nature of Jesus as the eternal Son of God. Ellen White also made that same dual emphasis. She pointed to Jesus’ eternity back in the 1870s when she described Jesus as the “eternal Son of God.” She also pointed to His begotten nature by constantly referring to Him as the "only begotten Son" in His pre-incarnate existence. In her theology the "only begotten Son" is defined as being "not a son by creation, as were angels, nor a son by adoption, as is the forgiven sinner, but a Son begotten in the express image of the Father's person, and in all the brightness of His majesty and glory, one equal with God in authority, dignity, and divine perfection. In him dwelt all the fullness of the Godhead bodily." (Ellen G. White, Signs of Times, May 30, 1895)

Before the 1890s Ellen White made no explicit anti-Trinitarian or semi-Arian statements. However, in Desire of Ages (1898) she made the shocking, to some, statement, "In Christ is life, original, unborrowed, underived," which brought about the development on the view of the Godhead. She also affirmed the personhood and divinity of the Holy Spirit who was “the Third Person of the Godhead, who would come with no modified energy, but in the fullness of divine power.”

In 1899, as editor of the Review and Herald, A. T. Jones wrote of the Godhead in a Trinitarian way: “God is one. Jesus Christ is one. The Holy Sprit is one. And these three are one: there is no dissent nor division among them.”

Over the next several decades, other Adventists explored the Bible on the Godhead and established the Adventist Trinitarian teaching on the topic. In fact, a creedal Trinitarian view was adopted by many leaders. This difference between the original pioneer position was a matter of grave concern as reflected in the following letter from A.W. Spalding:

“D.E. Robinson says that you are the first one he knows of to teach the straight doctrine of the trinity, in Australia…..There is to me a twilight zone in this history which I wish to have lighted.  Did all the fathers sin? And if so, did they repent?   How prove the unity of the faith in our succession if our pioneers were Arians and we are Athansians? (A.W. Spalding to H.C. Lacey, June 2, 1947)

Gradually after "transition and conflict" in the early 20th century this view of the Godhead was confirmed in Adventist theology, and by the middle of that century the Trinity became accepted. The move towards Trinitarianism can be observed in the successive doctrinal statements of the church. The 1872 Declaration of the Fundamental Principles taught and practiced by the Seventh-day AdventistsOnline Research Center: A Declaration of the Fundamental Principles Taught and Practiced by the Seventh-day Adventists, 1872 mentioned Father, Son and Holy Spirit but it did not present God as three persons thus it was non-Trinitarian:

"That there is one God, a personal, spiritual being, the creator of all things, omnipotent, omniscient, and eternal, infinite in wisdom, holiness, justice, goodness, truth, and mercy; unchangeable, and everywhere present by his representative, the Holy Spirit.

That there is one Lord Jesus Christ, the Son of the Eternal Father, the one by whom God created all things, and by whom they do consist...

By 1931 the Fundamental Beliefs of Seventh-Day AdventistsOnline Research Center: Fundamental Beliefs of Seventh-day Adventists, 1931 included a Trinitarian statement:

That the Godhead, or Trinity, consists of the Eternal Father, a personal, spiritual Being, omnipotent, omnipresent, omniscient, infinite in wisdom and love; the Lord Jesus Christ, the Son of the Eternal Father, through whom all things were created and through whom the salvation of the redeemed hosts will be accomplished; the Holy Spirit, the third person of the Godhead, the great regenerating power in the word of redemption.

According to LeRoy Froom this statement was written entirely by Francis Wilcox. This statement was never taken up for a vote by the General Conference.

“Realizing that the General Conference Committee or any other church body would never accept the document in the form in which it was written, Elder Wilcox, with full knowledge of the group, handed the statement directly to Edson Rogers, the General Conference statistician, who published it in the 1931 edition of the Yearbook, where it has appeared ever since. It was without the official approval of the General Conference Committee, therefore, and without any formal denominational adoption, that Elder Wilcox’s statement became the accepted declaration of our faith” (The Seventh-day Adventist
Church in Mission: 1919-1979) 

While this 1931 statement used the word Trinity in a positive sense it was imprecise regarding the eternal nature of the Son of God. It was purposefully written that way in order to make it acceptable to those in Adventism who still did not believe in a fully eternal Son. According to M.L. Andreasen there was still controversy within Adventism in the 1940s over the Trinity:

“The field is divided on the subject of the Trinity” (M.L. Andreason [General Conference Field Secretary] to Elder J.L. McElhany and Elder W.H. Branson, December 25, 1942 pg 5)

This division necessitated a very carefully worded statement:

"After carefully reading Wilcox's [1931] "Fundamental Beliefs" statement, Nichol expressed appreciation and approval of its scope and balance. He noted that it was conservatively stated- doubtless framed that way in the hope that it might be acceptable to those who had held divergent views, especially over the Godhead. Yes, that was true, Wilcox assented." (LeRoy Froom, Movement of Destinty pg 414 brackets added for clarity)

The first official Adventist Trinitarian statement, directly voted upon by the General Conference and adopted in 1980, include the following as statement number 2, "Trinity":

"There is one God: Father, Son and Holy Spirit, a unity of three co-eternal Persons. [...]".

Although it states "There is one God", some point out that missing in this statement is an indication of whether or not the "three co-eternal persons" are of one being or of one essence. This ambiguity allows for a variety of interpretive opinions within Adventism  and debate among critics about whether the current Adventist view of the Trinity is orthodox, or if Adventist views are tantamount to the heresy of Tritheism. Some Adventist scholars claim that Seventh-day Adventists are in harmony with the orthodoxy:

“Nature of God. A reading of the above statements will show that with respect to their doctrine of God Seventh-day Adventists are in harmony with the great creedal statements of Christendom, including the Apostles’ Creed, Nicea 325), and the additional definition of faith concerning the Holy Spirit as reached in Constantinople (381)”. (George Reid, Seventh-day Adventists: A Brief Introduction to Their Beliefs, Biblical Research Institute)

Other Adventist scholars have actually pointed out the distinction between the Adventist view and the orthodox view of this doctrine:

"She [Ellen G. White] taught that the Father, Son, and Holy Spirit are three distinct individuals, which is not true of the medieval doctrine of the Trinity."

"Ellen White's view did change—she was raised trinitarian, came to doubt some aspects of the trinitarianism she was raised on, and eventually came to a different trinitarian view from the traditional one. [...] In her earliest writings she differed from some aspects of traditional trinitarianism and in her latest writings she still strongly opposed some aspects of the traditional doctrine of the Trinity. (4) It appears, therefore, that the trinitarian teaching of Ellen White's later writings is not the same doctrine that the early Adventists rejected.11 Rather, her writings describe two contrasting forms of trinitarian belief, one of which she always opposed, and another that she eventually endorsed."

"But I would like to say, I think there were seven non-orthodox, which means those who did not hold their brand of Trinitarianism, which we reject today, along with them. So, we probably would have been branded as Arian by the orthodox."

"What James [SDA co-founder James White, husband of Ellen White] and the other men were opposed to, we are just as opposed to as they were. Now, their solution to that, at that time, they didn't see any solution by retaining the Trinity concept, and getting rid of its distortions. But, in reality, we have been faithful to their commitment, and I know of nothing that they were objecting to, in objecting to Trinitarianism, that we have not also objected to."

"A major development [in Adventism] since 1972 has been the quest to articulate biblical presuppositions grounding a biblical doctrine of the Trinity, clearly differentiated from the dualistic presuppositions that undergird the traditional creedal statements."

"In many ways the philosophical assumptions and presuppositions of our worldview are different from traditional Christianity and bring different perspectives on some of these old issues. We do not accept the traditional Platonic dualistic worldview and metaphysics that were foundational to the church fathers' theology of the Trinity, one of these being the concept of the immortality of the soul."

One Adventist sociology professor has described the Adventist view as follows:

"In spite of its clear monotheistic ring, the biblical account seems uncompromised on the idea of God as a group. While God has been declared to be one God (Deut. 6:4,1 Tim. 2:5), He has also been presented as a plurality of beings (1 John 5:7; Matthew 28:19; Ephesians 4:5)....What the notion of a triune (group) God seems to suggest is that the three members of the Godhead become joined in their relationship with each other, on the basis of their common purpose, values and interests."

It is important to note that not all Seventh-day Adventist Trinitarian teachers are agreed on this subject. Max Hatton is a Seventh-day Adventist minister who has authored "Understanding the Trinity" and "The Trinity Doctrine for Seventh-day Adventists. He disagrees with the view of God as a plurality of beings. He writes:

"Some Seventh-day Adventists accept the full Deity of the Father, the Son, and the Holy Spirit but they do not accept that they all exist in the one Substance. They see each of them existing in the same sort of substance but try as they may they cannot avoid the charge of Tritheism. This is not the true doctrine of the Trinity. Maybe this is why I sometimes hear that we should not use the word Trinity but should rather refer to the Three Persons as the Godhead. Call it what you like it is not the true teaching of Scripture to have Three separate beings combined in a unity of character, love and purpose (and this and that) as the True God. I cannot escape the conclusion that three separate beings of separate substance are nothing less than three separate gods – Tritheism..."Now a further thought. It seems to me that Jerry Moon and others have maintained the view that the three Members of the Trinity are human like figures. That being so they can’t for a moment think of the Three being in the one Substance. No, they think of them being separate but being united in such things as character and purpose. This recent thought of mine has helped me a lot to understand the reason why some Adventists have a Tritheistic type Trinity.

Other Adventist Trinitarians appear to have similar views.

“We cannot, for example, think of God as a family of three, or a committee that always votes unanimously. This separates the persons and compromises God's unity.” (Richard Rice, Reign of God: An Introduction to Christian Theology form a Seventh-day Adventist Perspective pg 61)

Despite their problematic history with this touchstone doctrine, the denomination has been "officially" Trinitarian for several decades. However, there is a growing resurgence of individuals within the church who argue that the authentic, historical Adventist position is semi-Arian.

Some scholars have denied that Ellen White was a major influence in the Adventist shift toward Trinitarian doctrine and have argued that early Adventism had neither an Arian, Semi-Arian, nor Trinitarian theology, but rather a materialist one.

Jesus Christ, God the Son
Seventh-day Adventists believe that "God the eternal Son became incarnate in Jesus Christ. Through Him all things were created, the character of God is revealed, the salvation of humanity is accomplished, and the world is judged. Foever truly God, He became also truly human, Jesus the Christ. He was conceived of the Holy Spirit and born of the virgin Mary. He lived and experienced temptation as a human being, but perfectly exemplified the righteousness and love of God. By His miracles He manifested God's power and was attested as God's promised Messiah. He suffered and died voluntarily on the cross for our sins and in our place, was raised from the dead, and ascended to heaven to minister in the heavenly sanctuary on our behalf. He will come again in glory for the final deliverance of His people and the restoration of all things (Isa. 53:4-6; Dan. 9:25-27; Luke 1:35; John 1:1-3, 14; 5:22; 10:30; 14:1-3, 9, 13; Rom. 6:23; 1 Cor. 15:3, 4; 2 Cor. 3:18; 5:17-19; Phil. 2:5-11; Col. 1:15-19; Heb. 2:9-18; 8:1, 2) (Taken from "Seventh-day Adventists BELIEVE--An exposition of the fundamental beliefs of the Seventh-day Adventist Church")

Holy Spirit
The early Adventists came from many different traditions, and hence there was also diversity on their views of the Holy Spirit. Some held an impersonal view of the Spirit, as emanating from God, or only a "power" or "influence". However the main emphasis at this time was on Adventist distinctives, not on topics such as the Holy Spirit.

J. H. Waggoner called it "that awful and mysterious power which proceeds from the throne of the universe". Uriah Smith similarly described it as "a mysterious influence emanating from the Father and the Son, their representative and the medium of their power" and a "divine afflatus".

Yet by the middle of 19th century, Adventists generally agreed the Spirit is a personal being, and part of the Trinity. Ellen White was influential in bringing about an understanding of the Holy Spirit and spoke of "the Third Person of the Godhead" repeatedly and "a divine person".

Some Adventist books include Le Roy Froom, The Coming of the Comforter (1928); W. H. Branson, The Holy Spirit (1933); G. B. Thompson, The Ministry of the Spirit (1914); Francis M. Wilcox, The Early and the Latter Rain (1938).

The human nature of Jesus Christ
Since the middle of the 20th century, there has been ongoing debate within Adventism concerning the nature of Jesus Christ, specifically whether Jesus Christ took on a fallen or an unfallen nature in the Incarnation. This was precipitated by the publication of Questions on Doctrine in 1957 which some Adventists felt did not agree with what the church held.

The debate revolves around the interpretation of several biblical texts:

"For God has done what the law, weakened by the flesh, could not do. By sending his own Son in the likeness of sinful flesh and for sin, he condemned sin in the flesh." Romans 8:3 (ESV)

"For we have not an high priest which cannot be touched with the feeling of our infirmities; but was in all points tempted like as we are, yet without sin." Hebrews 4:15 (KJV)

"...concerning his Son (Jesus), who was descended from David according to the flesh..." Romans 1:3 (ESV)

"Therefore, in all things He had to be made like His brethren, that He might be a merciful and faithful High Priest in things pertaining to God, to make propitiation for the sins of the people." Hebrews 2:17 NKJV

According to Adventist historian George Knight, most early Adventists (until 1950) believed that Jesus Christ was born with a human nature that was not only physically frail and subject to temptation, but that he also had sinful inclinations and desires. Since 1950, the "historic" wing of the church continues to hold this fallen view of Christ's human nature.

Adventists since 1950 believe that Jesus was made in the "likeness of sinful flesh," as He inherited the fallen human nature of Adam, with its physical and mental weaknesses and was tempted on all points. However His spiritual nature was unfallen and did not have the propensity to sin. Christ was tested by temptation, but did not have ungodly desires or sinful inclinations.

Ellen White states:
"Those who claim that it was not possible for Christ to sin, cannot believe that He really took upon Himself human nature. But was not Christ actually tempted, not only by Satan in the wilderness, but all through His life, from childhood to manhood? In all points He was tempted as we are, and because He successfully resisted temptation under every form, He gave man the perfect example, and through the ample provision Christ has made, we may become partakers of the divine nature, having escaped the corruption which is in the world through lust."

The controversy within Adventism over Christ's human nature is linked to the debate over whether it is possible for a "last generation" of Christian believers to achieve a state of
sinless perfection. These matters were discussed at the Questions on Doctrine 50th Anniversary Conference. Both points of view are currently represented at the Biblical Research Institute.

According to Woodrow W. Whidden II (himself a supporter of the "unfallen" position), proponents of the view that Christ possessed a "fallen" nature include M. L. Andreasen, Joe Crews, Herbert Douglass, Robert J. Wieland, Thomas Davis, C. Mervyn Maxwell, Dennis Priebe, Bobby Gordon and Ralph Larson. Proponents of the view that Christ's nature was "unfallen" include Edward Heppenstall,  Hans K. LaRondelle, Raoul Dederen, Norman Gulley, R. A. Anderson, Leroy E. Froom and W. E. Read.

Other doctrinal issues

Soteriology

Original sin
Seventh-day Adventists have historically preached a doctrine of inherited weakness, but not a doctrine of inherited guilt. Adventists believe that humans are sinful primarily due to the fall of Adam, but they do not accept the Augustinian/Calvinistic understanding of original sin, taught in terms of original guilt. According to Augustine and Calvin, humanity inherits not only Adam's depraved nature but also the actual guilt of his transgression, and Adventists look more toward the Wesleyan model.

In part, the Adventist position on original sin reads:

"The nature of the penalty for original sin, i.e., Adam's sin, is to be seen as literal, physical, temporal, or actual death – the opposite of life, i.e., the cessation of being. By no stretch of the scriptural facts can death be spiritualised as depravity. God did not punish Adam by making him a sinner. That was Adam’s own doing. All die the first death because of Adam’s sin regardless of their moral character – children included."

The early Adventists (such as George Storrs and Uriah Smith) wrote articles that de-emphasise the morally corrupt nature inherited from Adam, while stressing the importance of actual, personal sins committed by the individual. They thought of the "sinful nature" in terms of physical mortality rather than moral depravity. Traditionally, Adventists look at sin in terms of willful transgressions. They base their belief on texts such as "Whosoever committeth sin transgresseth also the law: for sin is the transgression of the law." (1 John 3:4)

A few Adventists have adopted a more evangelical view of original sin, which believes in humanity's inherently corrupt nature and spiritual separation from God. They conceive of original sin as a state into which all humans are born, and from which we cannot escape without the grace of God. As one recent Adventist writer has put it, "Original sin is not per se wrong doing, but wrong being."

Soteriology and free will
The Seventh-day Adventist church stands in the Wesleyan tradition (which in turn is an expression of Arminianism) in regard to its soteriological teachings. Wesley's views are opposed to the Augustinian/Tridentine version of justification which understood divine acquittal and forgiveness as the fruit of an infused righteousness.

This is significant in two respects. Firstly, there is a very strong emphasis in Adventist teaching on sanctification as a necessary and inevitable consequence of salvation in Christ. Such an emphasis on obedience is not considered to detract from the reformation principle of sola fide ("faith alone"), but rather to provide an important balance to the doctrine of justification by faith, and to guard against antinomianism. While asserting that Christians are saved entirely by the grace of God, Adventists also stress obedience to the law of God as the proper response to salvation.

Secondly, Adventist teaching strongly emphasises free will; each individual is free either to accept or reject God's offer of salvation. Adventists therefore oppose the Calvinistic/Reformed doctrines of predestination (or unconditional election), limited atonement and perseverance of the saints ("once saved always saved"). Questions on Doctrine stated that Adventists believe "That man is free to choose or reject the offer of salvation through Christ; we do not believe that God has predetermined that some men shall be saved and others lost." The freedom of each individual to accept or reject God is integral to the Great Controversy theme.

"God could have prevented sin by creating a universe of robots that would do only what they were programmed to do. But God's love demanded that He create beings who could respond freely to His love—and such a response is possible only from beings who have the power of choice."

Assurance of salvation in Christ is part of the official beliefs, and an estimated 69% of Adventists "Have assurance of salvation", according to a 2002 worldwide survey of local church leaders.

Sinless perfection
The question of whether Christians can overcome sin and achieve a state of sinless perfection is a controversial topic for Seventh-day Adventists, as it is among the holiness movement and Pentecostalism. Mainstream Adventists hold that Christ is our example and shows mankind the path to overcome sin, and to manifest Christ's perfect and righteous character. They hold to the 28 Fundamental Beliefs of Seventh-day Adventists which in #10 states 'we are given the power to live a holy life' and right before that 'we are born again and sanctified' through the Holy Spirit. Ellen White wrote that the saints through faith in Christ would to reach a state such as Adam before the Fall, and refers in many of her writings that through Christ, He made it possible to overcome sin.

In his book The Sanctuary Service (1947), M. L. Andreasen taught that sinless perfection can be achieved; his theology continues to be influential among Adventists. Some Adventists insist that a final generation of believers, who will live through the "time of trouble" (between the close of probation and second coming of Christ), who receive the seal of God mentioned in Revelation 7:3, must and will attain a state of sinlessness comparable to the pre-fall condition of Adam and Eve. They believe that historically this is the authentic Adventist position on the issue as taught by Ellen White, and that denominational leaders along with Progressive Adventists, have erred in moving away from it. Larry Kirkpatrick and the "Last Generation" movement www.LastGenerationTheology.org—The Final Atonement is Now Underway are representative of this stream of teaching.  Such quote various texts such as

However, some Adventist theologians such as Edward Heppenstall have argued the view that this state of absolute sinlessness or perfection is not possible in this life, and that Christians will always rely on forgiving grace—even after the "close of probation". It is argued that "perfection" in the Bible refers to spiritual maturity, having "the continual counteracting presence of the Holy Spirit" to be "victorious over sin and the sinful nature within us", as opposed to absolute sinlessness.

Ministry and worship

Ordination of women

The Adventist Church world church does not officially, at this time, support the ordination of women to ministry within its standard procedures. Instead women pastors in the denomination hold the title of "commissioned" rather than "ordained," which allows them to perform almost all of the pastoral functions their male colleagues perform but with a lesser title. This compromise was reached during the 1990s, with disagreement primarily occurring along cultural lines. Although the Seventh-day Adventist Church has no written policy forbidding the ordination of women, it has traditionally ordained only men. From its formation, Adventists traditionally held to the view that no precedent for the practice of ordaining women can be found in Scripture or in the writings of Ellen G. White and the early Seventh-day Adventist Church. However, in recent years the ordination of women has been the subject of heated debate, especially in North America and Europe. In the Adventist church, candidates for ordination are chosen by local conferences (which usually administer about 50-150 local congregations) and approved by unions (which serve about 6-12 conferences). The world headquarters—the General Conference—says that the GC has the right to set the worldwide qualifications for ordination, including gender requirements. GC leaders have never taken the position that ordination of women is contrary to the Bible, but they have insisted that no one ordain women until it is acceptable to all parts of the world church.

In 1990 the General Conference in world session voted not to establish a worldwide policy permitting the ordination of women, but they did not vote a policy forbidding such either. In 1995 GC delegates voted not to authorize each of the 13 world divisions to establish ordination policies specific to its part of the world. In 2010, the North American Division of the church voted to allow commissioned pastors to lead a Conference or Mission, as well as ordained ones. In 2011, the North American Division, without GC approval, voted to permit women to serve as conference presidents. In early 2012, the GC responded to the NAD action with an analysis of church history and policy, demonstrating that divisions do not have the authority to establish policy different from GC policy. The NAD immediately rescinded their action. But in their analysis the GC reminded the world membership that the “final responsibility and authority” for deciding who is ordained resides at the union level. This led to decisions by several unions to approve ordinations without regard to gender.

In March 2012, several unions and conferences voted to support the ordination of women. These are the Mid America Union, the Pacific Union Conference, the Southeastern California conference, the Columbia Union, and the Potomac Conference.

On April 23, 2012, the North German Union voted to ordain women as ministers, but by late 2013 had not yet ordained a woman. On July 29, 2012, the Columbia Union Conference voted to "authorize ordination without respect to gender." On August 19, 2012 the Pacific Union Conference also voted to ordain without regard to gender. Both unions began immediately approving ordinations of women. By mid-2013, about 25 women had been ordained to the ministry in the Pacific Union Conference, plus several in the Columbia Union. On May 12, 2013, the Danish Union voted to treat men and women ministers the same, and to suspend all ordinations until after the topic is considered at the next GC session in 2015. On May 30, 2013 the Netherlands Union voted to ordain female pastors, recognizing them as equal to their male colleagues. On Sept. 1, 2013, a woman was ordained in the Netherlands Union.

In 2012-2013 the General Conference assembled several committees to study the issue and make a recommendation to be voted at the 2015 world General Conference session.

On October 27, 2013, Sandra Roberts became the first woman to lead a Seventh-day Adventist conference when she was elected as president of the Southeastern California Conference. However, the worldwide Seventh-day Adventist church did not recognize this because presidents of conferences must be ordained pastors and the worldwide church did not recognize the ordination of women.

As Protestant Christians who accept the Bible as their only rule of faith and practice, Seventh-day Adventists on both sides of the issue employ the same Bible texts and arguments used by other Protestants (e.g. 1 Tim. 2:12 and Gal. 3:28), but the fact that the most prominent and authoritative co-founder of the church—Ellen White—was a woman, also affects the discussion. Proponents of ordaining women point out that Adventists believe that Ellen White was chosen by God as a leader, preacher and teacher; that she remains the highest authority, outside the Bible, in the Seventh-day Adventist Church today; that she was regularly issued ordination credentials, which she carried without objection; and that she supported the ordination of women to at least some ministry roles. Opponents argue that because she was a prophet her example does not count, and that although she said she was ordained by God, she was never ordained in the ordinary way, by church leaders.

On July 8, 2015, delegates to the General Conference Business Session, in San Antonio, Texas, voted 1,381-977 against allowing divisions the authority to ordain women.   Ted N. C. Wilson, President of the General Conference, appealed to the world church to accept the decision, and also stated that "the vote means we maintain the current policy" (commissioning women, ordaining men as pastors).

In 2022, the Rocky Mountain Conference (RMC) approved ordaining women pastors.

Baptism

Seventh-day Adventists practice believer's baptism by full immersion in a similar manner to the Baptists. They argue that baptism requires knowing consent and moral responsibility. Hence, they do not baptize infants or children who do not demonstrate knowing consent and moral responsibility, but instead dedicate them, which is symbolic of the parents', the community's, and the church's gratefulness to God for the child, and their commitment to raising the child to love Jesus. Seventh-day Adventists believe that baptism is a public statement to commit one's life to Jesus and is a prerequisite for church membership. Baptism is only practiced after the candidate has gone through Bible lessons.  According to the Bible, the act of baptism shows that the person has repented of sin and wishes to live a life in Christ.
.

Holy Communion
Seventh-day Adventists believe that the bread and wine (grape juice) of the Holy Communion are "symbols" of the body and blood of Jesus; however, Christ is also "present to meet and strengthen His people" in the experience of communion. Adventists practice "the ordinance of footwashing" prior to each celebration of the Lord's Supper, on account of the gospel account of John 13:1-16.

Spiritual gifts

The 17th fundamental belief of the church affirms that the spiritual gifts continue into the present.

Adventists generally believe the legitimate gift of tongues is of speaking unlearned human languages only, and are generally critical of the gift as practiced by charismatic and Pentecostal Christians today.

Creationism
The Seventh-day Adventist doctrine of creationism is based on believing that the opening chapters of Genesis should be interpreted as literal history. Adventist belief holds that all Earthly life originated during a six-day period some 6000 years ago, and a global flood destroyed all land based animals and humans except for those saved on Noah's Ark. Traditional Adventists oppose theories which propose interpreting the days of creation symbolically. Adventists reject the naturalistic views of abiogenesis and evolution.

Although Adventists hold that creation week was a recent event, they believe the Bible speaks of other worlds populated by intelligent beings elsewhere in the universe, which pre-existed the Earth's creation. The Seventh-day Adventist Ministerial Association's Seventh-day Adventists Believe (2005), explains that the opening chapters of Genesis describe a limited creation:

'The "heavens" of Genesis 1 and 2 probably refer to our sun and its system of planets. Indeed, the earth, instead of being Christ's first creation, was most likely His last one. The Bible pictures the sons of God, probably the Adams of all the unfallen worlds, meeting with God in some distant corner of the universe (Job 1:6-12). So far, space probes have discovered no other inhabited planets. They apparently are situated in the vastness of space—well beyond the reach of our sin-polluted solar system quarantined against the infection of sin.'

While the majority of Adventists believe that all biological life was originally created recently during a literal week, there is a range of positions amongst Adventists regarding when the inorganic material of the universe and planet Earth was created.
Some Adventists hold that the entire physical universe was created at the commencement of the literal Creation week, though it is generally recognised that the creation of angels and the conflict between Lucifer and God would need to have occurred prior to the Creation event described in Genesis 1. Other Adventists hold that the universe was created prior to the Creation week, but that planet Earth and its immediate surroundings were created de novo at the commencement of that week.
Finally, another mainstream Adventist position is that the inorganic matter of planet Earth was created prior to the Creation week and was reshaped into its present inhabitable form during that week. All of these Adventist positions agree that the computed radiometric dates of standard geology are largely irrelevant to dating the creation of life on Earth. Clyde Webster calls radiometric dating an "interpretive science" with uncertainties. He stated that "it would seem logical, almost compelling to seriously consider other sources of data for determining the time of Creation" concluding that for a Christian scientist "such a primary source is the Holy Scripture."

Adventists were influential in the redevelopment of creationism in the 20th Century. Seventh-day Adventist geologist George McCready Price was responsible for reviving flood geology in the early 20th century. He was quoted heavily by William Jennings Bryan in the Scopes Monkey Trial. His ideas were later borrowed by Henry Morris and John Whitcomb for their landmark 1961 creationist text The Genesis Flood. The Morris and Whitcomb position is distinct from Seventh-day Adventism because they postulate both a young earth and a young universe.

About the time that The Genesis Flood was having a large impact in the evangelical world, a number of progressive Adventist scholars educated in secular universities began promoting Theistic Evolution. Some Progressive Adventists no longer hold the literal view of Genesis 1. Other Adventist scholars have identified the consequences of moving away from understanding that the Creation week involved a recent literal week.

In 2009, the Seventh-day Adventist Church held an international creation emphasis day as part of a "worldwide denominational celebration of the biblical account of creation." The event was part of a church initiative to underscore its commitment to a literal creation model. In 2010, the World Seventh-day Adventist Church's highest ecclesiastical body, the World General Conference Session, officially reaffirmed the Church's position in support of a literal six-day creation week.

The scapegoat
Adventists teach that the scapegoat, or Azazel, is a symbol for Satan. They believe that Satan will finally have to bear the responsibility for the sins of the believers of all ages, and that this was foreshadowed on the Day of Atonement when the high priest confessed the sins of Israel over the head of the scapegoat (Leviticus 16:21).

This belief has drawn criticism from some Christians, who feel this gives Satan the status of sin-bearer alongside Jesus Christ. Adventists have responded by insisting that Satan is not a saviour, nor does he provide atonement for sin; Christ alone is the substitutionary sacrifice for sin, but holds no responsibility for it. In the final judgment, responsibility for sin is passed back to Satan who first caused mankind to sin.  As the responsible party, Satan receives the wages for his sin and the sins of all the saved—namely, death. Thus, the unsaved are held responsible for their own sin, while the saved are no longer held responsible for theirs.

Sunday law

Traditionally, Adventists have taught there will be a time before the Second Advent in which the message of the Ten Commandments and in particular the keeping of the seventh day of the week, Saturday, as Sabbath will be conveyed to the whole world. Protestants and Catholics will unite to enforce legislation requiring the observance of Sunday worship. In reference to the creation of an Image to the Beast Revelation 13-17, Ellen G. White stated:

"When the leading churches of the United States, uniting on such points of doctrines as are held by them in common, shall influence the state to enforce their decrees and to sustain their institutions; then Protestant America will have formed an image of the Roman hierarchy, and the infliction of civil penalties upon dissenters will inevitably result." -Great Controversy p. 445

Three Angels’ Messages

From the time of Second Great Awakening the Millerite movement proclaimed the soon return of Jesus. Adventists have traditionally interpreted this as the initial proclamation of the three angels' messages. The "three angels' messages" is an interpretation of the messages given by three angels in Revelation . The Seventh-day Adventist church teaches that these messages are given to prepare the world for the second coming of Jesus Christ, and sees them as a central part of its own mission.

The Seventh-day Adventist Church has traditionally believed that it is the remnant church of Bible prophecy, and that its mission is to proclaim the three angels' messages.

 "The universal church is composed of all who truly believe in Christ, but in the last days, a time of widespread apostasy, a remnant has been called out to keep the commandments of God and the faith of Jesus. This remnant announces the arrival of the judgment hour, proclaims salvation through Christ, and heralds the approach of His second advent. This proclamation is symbolized by the three angels of Revelation 14; it coincides with the work of judgment in heaven and results in a work of repentance and reform on earth. Every believer is called to have a personal part in this worldwide witness."
Fundamental Beliefs of the Seventh-day Adventist Church 

"In accordance with God's uniform dealing with mankind, warning them of coming events that will vitally affect their destiny, He has sent forth a proclamation of the approaching return of Christ. This preparatory message is symbolized by the three angels’ messages of Revelation 14, and meets its fulfillment in the great Second Advent Movement today. This has brought forth the remnant, or Seventh-day Adventist Church, keeping the commandments of God and the faith of Jesus."
Seventh-day Adventist Church Manual

The Mission Statement of the church declares:
"The mission of the Seventh-day Adventist Church is to proclaim to all peoples the everlasting gospel of God's love in the context of the three angels' messages of Revelation 14:6–12, and as revealed in the life, death, resurrection, and high priestly ministry of Jesus Christ, leading them to accept Jesus as personal Saviour and Lord and to unite with His remnant church; and to nurture believers as disciples in preparation for His soon return."

Some critics and Progressive Adventists, typically reject the claim that the three angels' messages find unique fulfillment in the Seventh-day Adventist Church. Mainstream Adventists believe that God has led the Christian movements in history, but progressives tend to deny putting Adventism on that level.

See also

28 Fundamental Beliefs (Adventist)
Millerites
List of Seventh-day Adventist hospitals
List of Seventh-day Adventist medical schools
List of Seventh-day Adventist secondary schools
List of Seventh-day Adventist colleges and universities

Notes

References
Books
 
 
 
 
 
 
 
 
 
Journals
 
 
 
Web

Further reading
 Andrews Study Bible, 2010. The New King James Version (NKJV), with commentary by Seventh-day Adventist scholars
 Biblical Research Institute series: George W. Reid, ed., Understanding Scripture: An Adventist Approach vol. 1; Gerhard Pfandl, ed., Interpreting Scripture Bible Questions and Answers vol. 2
 Seventh-day Adventist Commentary Reference Series, including the Bible Commentary, Encyclopedia, and the Handbook of Seventh-day Adventist Theology
 Damsteegt, P. Gerard, et al. (1988). Seventh-day Adventists Believe: a Biblical Exposition of 27 Fundamental Doctrines. Washington, D.C.: Ministerial Association, General Conference of Seventh-day Adventists. 
  First edition 1985
 Norman Gulley, Systematic Theology series (in process). Vol 1 Prolegomena
 Seventh-day Adventists Believe (A Biblical Exposition of 27 Fundamental Doctrines). Ministerial Association, General Conference of Seventh-day Adventists, 1998
 Fritz Guy, Thinking Theologically: Adventist Christianity and the Interpretation of Faith. Berrien Springs, Michigan: Andrews University Press, 1999 (publisher's page)
  This book "constitute[s] how a representative group of Australian teachers explain their beliefs."
 Rolf Pöhler, Continuity and Change in Adventist Teaching: A Case Study in Doctrinal Development. Frankfurt am Main: Peter Lang, 2001 (publisher's page). Pöhler, and possibly Knight, are reviewed in Alden Thompson, "Gored by Every Sharp Tongue?" Spectrum 29 (Summer 2001), p68–71

External links
 Fundamental Beliefs on the church's official website
 Biblical Research Institute of the General Conference of Seventh-day Adventists
 Theology articles as cataloged in the Seventh-day Adventist Periodical Index (SDAPI). See also the Selected subject index by the Association of Seventh-day Adventist Librarians (ASDAL)